Tiefer (German for deeper) is the third and final studio album by the pop rock band Lucilectric. It was released in 1997 on Electrola.

Track listing

All tracks written by van Org and Goldkind

Personnel
 Luci van Org - lead vocals, producer
 Ralf Goldkind - vocals, guitar, keyboard & executive producer

Additional musicians
 Gerry Schmalzl - electric & acoustic guitar
 Ingo Kraus - special effects
 Jurij Panfilowitsch - ride cymbal
 Michi Beck - backing vocals
 Thomas D. - backing vocals
 Rose Zone - backing vocals

Production
 And.Y - Producer and engineer
 Klaus Scharff - engineering
 Johannes Schmöling - sound engineering
 Achim Kruse post-production

Additional personnel
 Phoor Design - sleeve concept and artwork

References

1997 albums
Lucilectric albums